Suresh Kumar Mandal is a Nepalese politician who is elected member of Provincial Assembly of Madhesh Province from People's Socialist Party, Nepal. Mandal, a resident of Kalyanpur, Siraha was elected to the 2017 provincial assembly election from Siraha 4(B).

Electoral history

2017 Nepalese provincial elections

References

External links

Living people
Members of the Provincial Assembly of Madhesh Province
Madhesi people
People from Siraha District
People's Socialist Party, Nepal politicians
1980 births